Max Lüscher (9 September 1923 – 2 February 2017) was a Swiss psychotherapist known for inventing the Lüscher color test, a tool for measuring an individual's psychophysical state based on their color preferences. Besides research, teaching and practicing psychotherapy in Basel, Lüscher worked for international companies, amongst other things giving color advice. His book The Lüscher Test has been translated into more than 30 languages.

Biography
Max Lüscher was born in Basel, Switzerland on 9 September 1923. After receiving his Swiss "Matura", comparable to a diploma, he focused on studying psychiatry and achieved his doctorate in the areas of philosophy, psychology, and the philosophy of law. Lüscher completed his dissertation on "Color as an aid in psychological diagnosis". This project was chosen as the summa cum laude by his professors. After this, working as a psychotherapist, Lüscher created his first color test which was published in 1947. This test used color cards to determine the current emotional state of the test-taker. From 1961 to 1965, Lüscher lived in Berlin and continued his career as a psychotherapist. Lüscher was noted for his guest lectures and training seminars for physicians. The "Lüscher Color-Diagnostics" are now used in several universities across the world.

The Lüscher test colors

The test colors from the Lüscher Color-Diagnosis chosen based on favoritism. The test-taker chooses the card color they like best and then orders the rest from most-preferred to lease-preferred. Numbers are printed on the backside of each card, and after the test-taker orders them, the examiner turns them over and references an accompanying book that contains all of the different number combinations and their meaning. Lüscher argues that the subject's choice of color shows the state of their psychosomatic and emotional status and how they feel about themselves.

Lüscher relates to his four fundamental colors to the following fundamental categories:

Blue: Contentment
Feeling of belonging, the inner connection and the relationship to one’s partner.
"How I feel towards a person that is close to me"

Green: Self-respect
Inner control of willpower and the capacity to enjoy.
"The way I want to be"

Red: Self confidence<ref>[http://www.luscher-color.ch/base.asp?p=Info_Rot.htm&s=d&m=m_theorie.asp See and hear Self confidence]</ref>
Activity, drive and the reaction to challenges.
"How I react to challenges"

Yellow: DevelopmentAttitude of anticipation, attitude towards future development and towards new encounters.
"What I expect for the future"

A 1984 comparison of the Lüscher color test and the Minnesota Multiphasic Personality Inventory found little agreement between the two tests, prompting the authors to urge cautious use of the former.

Bibliography
 Max Lüscher: „The Lüscher Colour Test", Remarkable Test That Reveals Your Personality Through Color, Pan Books, 1972, 
 Max Lüscher: „Color - the mother tongue of the unconscious", Capsugel N.V. (1973)
 Max Lüscher: „The 4-Color Person", Pocketbooks, Simon Schuster, 1979, 
 Max Lüscher, „Colors of Love" : Getting in Touch with Your Romantic Self, St. Martin's Press, New York, 1996, 
 Max Lüscher: „The Luscher Profile", Mindscape (1986), ASIN B000WY2OU8
 Max Lüscher: „Personality Signs", Warner Books, 1981, 
 Max Lüscher: „Der Lüscher-Test. Persönlichkeitsbeurteilung durch Farbwahl", Rowohlt, Reinbek, 1985, 
 Max Lüscher: „Das Harmoniegesetz in uns", Ullstein, 2003, 
 Max Lüscher: „Der Vier-Farben-Mensch"'', Ullstein, 2005,

References

External links
 Basics about Lüscher's Color Diagnostik - 7 languages - including English
 Max Lüscher: The logical bases of the ethical norms (Powerpoint presentation)
 Biography of Max Lüscher
 The Colour blue - musically interpreted according to Max Lüscher (example)
 Einführung in die Psychologik (Introduction to Psychologics) - (mp3) - German spoken by Prof. Max Lüscher
 

1923 births
2017 deaths
Psychology writers
20th-century Swiss  philosophers
21st-century Swiss philosophers
Swiss psychiatrists
Swiss psychologists